The first season of the American television drama series House of Cards premiered exclusively via Netflix's web streaming service on February 1, 2013. The season was produced by Media Rights Capital, and the executive producers are David Fincher, Kevin Spacey, Eric Roth, Joshua Donen, Dana Brunetti, Andrew Davies, Michael Dobbs, John Melfi, and Beau Willimon.

House of Cards was created for television by Beau Willimon. It is an adaptation of a previous BBC miniseries of the same name by Andrew Davies, which was based on the novel by Michael Dobbs. Set in present-day Washington, D.C., House of Cards is the story of Frank Underwood (Kevin Spacey), a Democrat from South Carolina's 5th congressional district and the House Majority Whip, who, after getting passed over for appointment as Secretary of State, decides to exact his revenge on those who betrayed him. The series also stars Robin Wright, Kate Mara, and Corey Stoll in lead roles.

The fifth and sixth episodes of this season marked the final directing work of Joel Schumacher.

Cast
 Kevin Spacey as Francis J. Underwood, a U.S. Congressman from South Carolina and the House Majority Whip.
 Robin Wright as Claire Underwood, Frank Underwood's wife and the CEO of the Clean Water Initiative, a non-profit organization devoted to environmental awareness.
 Kate Mara as Zoe Barnes, an ambitious young journalist working for the Washington Herald and eventual lover of Frank Underwood.
 Corey Stoll as Peter Russo, a U.S. Congressman from Pennsylvania and eventual candidate for Governor of Pennsylvania.
 Michael Kelly as Douglas "Doug" Stamper, Frank Underwood's loyal Chief of Staff.
 Kristen Connolly as Christina Gallagher, Peter Russo's Chief of Staff and girlfriend.
 Sakina Jaffrey as Linda Vasquez, the White House Chief of Staff in the Walker Administration.
 Sandrine Holt as Gillian Cole, a respected charity worker and eventual employee of Claire Underwood at the CWI.
 Constance Zimmer as Janine Skorsky, a veteran political reporter at the Washington Herald and their White House correspondent.
 Michel Gill as Garrett Walker, the President of the United States and former governor from Colorado.
 Sebastian Arcelus as Lucas Goodwin, a senior political reporter at the Washington Herald.
 Mahershala Ali as Remy Danton, a lobbyist at law firm Glendon Hill who represents SanCorp, a powerful natural gas company.
 Ben Daniels as Adam Galloway, a world-renowned photographer and occasional lover of Claire Underwood.
 Boris McGiver as Tom Hammerschmidt, the editor-in-chief of the Washington Herald.
 Dan Ziskie as Jim Matthews, the Vice President of the United States and former Governor of Pennsylvania.
 Jayne Atkinson as Catherine Durant, the U.S. Secretary of State and former Senator from Louisiana.
 Nathan Darrow as Edward Meechum, a member of the Capitol Police and former U.S. Marine who serves as the new bodyguard for Frank and Claire Underwood.
 Elizabeth Norment as Nancy Kaufberger, secretary for House Majority Whip Frank Underwood.
 Reg E. Cathey as Freddy Hayes, the owner of a BBQ restaurant that is frequented by Frank Underwood.
 Rachel Brosnahan as Rachel Posner, a prostitute desiring to escape her position in life.
 Larry Pine as Speaker of the House of Representatives Bob Birch.
 Tawny Cypress as Carly Heath, the editor-in-chief of news blog Slugline.
 Karl Kenzler as Charles Holburn, a U.S. senator, friend of the Underwoods and husband of Felicity Holburn.
 Francie Swift as Felicity Holburn, a friend of the Underwoods and wife of Charles Holburn.
 Chance Kelly as Steve, a bodyguard and driver for Frank Underwood.
 Al Sapienza as Marty Spinella, the Head Lobbyist for the associated teacher's unions.
 Kathleen Chalfant as Margaret Tilden, the owner of Washington Herald.
 Chuck Cooper as Barney Hull, chief of the Metropolitan Police Department of the District of Columbia (MPDC).
 Wass Stevens as Paul Capra, a senior union official in South Philadelphia and a friend of Peter Russo's.
 Gerald McRaney as Raymond Tusk, a billionaire entrepreneur with holdings in the field of nuclear energy.
 Reed Birney as Donald Blythe, a respected and long-serving Representative from New Hampshire who has many years experience on education.
 Kevin Kilner as Michael Kern, a Senator from Colorado and candidate for the post of Secretary of State.
 Maryann Plunkett as Evelyn Baxter, business associate of Claire Underwood and a former office manager at the Clean Water Initiative. 
 Michael Siberry as David Rasmussen, the House Majority Leader.
 Kenneth Tigar as Walter Doyle, an associate of Frank Underwood's.
 David Andrews as Tim Corbett, a former friend of Frank Underwood who owns a rafting company.
 Phyllis Somerville as Mrs. Russo, Peter Russo's mother.
 Michael Warner as Oliver Spence, Claire Underwood's attorney.

Episodes

<onlyinclude>{{Episode table
|background = #504f5d
|overall    = 6
|season     = 6
|title      = 20
|director   = 15
|writer     = 30
|airdate    = 15
|released   = y
|prodcode   = 8
|episodes=

{{Episode list/sublist|House of Cards (season 1)
 |EpisodeNumber   = 4
 |EpisodeNumber2  = 4
 |Title           = Chapter 4
 |DirectedBy      = James Foley
 |WrittenBy       = Rick Cleveland and Beau Willimon
 |OriginalAirDate = 
 |ProdCode        = HOC-104
 |ShortSummary    = Frank resorts to intricate string-pulling when House Speaker Bob Birch refuses to support the education bill with its controversial amendments, organizing a coup against Birch using House Majority Leader David Rasmussen in order to pressure Birch to cooperate. He ensures Rep. Terry Womack's support for the coup by forcing Russo to allow a shipyard in his district to close in order to keep a military base in Womack's district open. Birch relents and Womack replaces Rasmussen as majority leader. Meanwhile, Tom is exasperated with Zoe's rebelliousness but the Herald'''s publisher supports her. Tom offers Zoe the position of White House correspondent and she indicates acceptance, but Frank convinces her to decline it, which further antagonizes Tom. Remy Danton, a lobbyist and former employee of Frank's, offers Claire double the donation previously promised to CWI, which would allow them to hire back the staff they laid off. However, Frank pressures Claire to refuse it, suspicious of Remy's motives. Claire meets with photographer Adam Galloway, a former lover who tries to rekindle their relationship. Zoe invites Frank to her apartment for an intimate encounter.
 |LineColor       = 504f5d
}}

}}</onlyinclude>

Reception

Critical response
The first season received positive reviews from critics. On Metacritic, the season received a weighted mean score of 76 out of 100 based on 25 reviews, which translates to "generally positive reception." On Rotten Tomatoes, the season received a score of 85% with an average rating of 8.2 out of 10 based on 39 reviews; the site's consensus reads, "Bolstered by strong performances — especially from Kevin Spacey — and surehanded direction, House of Cards is a slick, engrossing drama that may redefine how television is produced." USA Today critic Robert Bianco praised the series, particularly Spacey and Wright's lead performances, stating "If you think network executives are nervous, imagine the actors who have to go up against that pair in the Emmys." Tom Gilatto of People Weekly lauded the first two episodes, calling them "cinematically rich, full of sleek, oily pools of darkness." In her review for The Denver Post, Joanne Ostrow said the series is "Deeply cynical about human beings as well as politics and almost gleeful in its portrayal of limitless ambition." She added: "House of Cards is a wonderfully sour take on power and corruption."

Awards
On July 18, 2013, House of Cards became the first Primetime Emmy Award nominated series for original online only web television for the 65th Primetime Emmy Awards. Among those nine nominations were Outstanding Drama Series, Outstanding Lead Actor in a Drama Series for Kevin Spacey, Outstanding Lead Actress in a Drama Series for Robin Wright, and Outstanding Directing for a Drama Series for David Fincher. The first season was also nominated for Casting, Cinematography, Editing, Music, and Main Title Music at the 65th Primetime Creative Arts Emmy Awards. On September 15, the series became the first web television series and the first web television webisode to be Primetime Emmy Awarded with two wins at the 65th Primetime Creative Arts Emmy Awards: Eigil Bryld for Outstanding Cinematography for a Single-Camera Series and Laray Mayfield and Julie Schubert for Outstanding Casting for a Drama Series. On September 22, Netflix made history with a total three wins including Fincher's Outstanding Directing for a Drama Series for directing the pilot episode "Chapter 1" in addition to the pair of Creative Arts Emmy Awards, making "Chapter 1" the first Primetime Emmy-awarded webisode. None of the Emmy awards were considered to be in major categories, however.

Spacey received best actor nominations at the 20th Screen Actors Guild Awards, 71st Golden Globe Awards, and 18th Satellite Awards. Wright won best actress at both the 71st Golden Globe Awards and 18th Satellite Awards, while Stoll was nominated at both for supporting actor and the series was nominated at both for best drama. Wright's Golden Globe Award for Best Actress – Television Series Drama for her portrayal of Claire Underwood made her the first actress to win a Golden Globe Award for an online-only web television series. The show won a 2013 Peabody Award for Area of Excellence.

At the 3rd Critics' Choice Television Awards, Kevin Spacey and Corey Stoll were nominated for Best Drama Actor and Best Drama Supporting Actor, respectively. The show has also been nominated at the 29th TCA Awards for the Outstanding New Program and the Program of the Year. The show was also nominated at the 40th People's Choice Awards for Favorite Streaming Series, at the Producers Guild of America Awards 2013 for Outstanding Producer of Episodic Television, Drama, at the 66th Directors Guild of America Awards for Outstanding Directing – Drama Series, at the Writers Guild of America Awards 2013 for Television: Dramatic Series, Television: New Series and Television: Episodic Drama, winning new series.

In addition, the success of House of Cards and popularity of Breaking Bad'', both of which are only available in the United Kingdom online has caused a rule change for the British Academy Television Awards and British Academy Television Craft Awards beginning with the ceremonies for the 2013 calendar year on May 18, 2014 and April 27, 2014, respectively. At the 2014 British Academy Television Awards the show was nominated for Best International Programme.

Home media
The first season was released on DVD and Blu-ray in region 1 on June 11, 2013, in region 2 on June 10, 2013, and in region 4 on June 27, 2013.

Director's commentaries for all of the first-season episodes premiered on Netflix on January 3, 2014. They had not been included on the home video release.

References

External links

2013 American television seasons
House of Cards (American TV series) seasons